Opera is a 2020 South Korean/American animated short film by Erick Oh, who worked on Pig: The Dam Keeper Poems.

Summary
A nonnarrative look at humanity (religion, class struggle, racism, war and terrorism) on a loop at a massive scale.

Accolades
In 2021, it was nominated for an Academy Award for Best Animated Short Film.

See also
Minimalist film
Independent animation

References

External links

2020 animated films
2020 short films
American animated short films
South Korean animated short films
2020 films
2020s American films